Australian Targa Championship is a tarmac-based rally Championship held in Australia, annually. The inaugural event was 2012. The Championship uses closed public roads in a variety of different sports cars in competitive events over three states.

Events
 Targa Tasmania - Tasmania, Australia
 Targa Adelaide - South Australia, Australia
 Targa High Country - Victoria, Australia
 Targa Wrest Point - Tasmania, Australia

List of past winners

Modern Competition

Classic Competition

References

www.targatasmania.com.au/Results/Past  
http://www.targatasmania.com.au/   
2012 Australian Targa Championship Results

External links
 Australian Targa Championship website

Targa
Rally competitions in Australia